was a Japanese actor.

His son was child actor Sō Shuntarō. He appeared in more than 400 films between 1928 and 1986. His final film role was in the 1986 film Dixieland Daimyō directed by Kihachi Okamoto.

Selected filmography

 Story of a Beloved Wife (1951)
 Dedication of the Great Buddha (1952)
 Gate of Hell (1953)
 Ugetsu (1953)
 Sansho the Bailiff (1954)
 The Second Son (1955)
 The Renyasai Yagyu Hidden Story (1956)
 Suzakumon (1957)
 Enjō (1958)
 The Loyal 47 Ronin (1958)
 Nichiren: A Man of Many Miracles (1958) as Hōjō Sanemasa
 Samurai Vendetta (1959)
 Scar Yosaburo (1960)
 The Story of Osaka Castle (1961) as Michiiku Itamiya
 Akō Rōshi (1961) as Matsumae Izunokami
 Hangyakuji (1961) as Ōkubo Tadayo
 Love Under the Crucifix (1962)
 13 Assassins (1963) as Rōjū
 Bushido, Samurai Saga (1963) as Kōzuki Genza
 Kojiki Taishō (1964)
 Zatoichi's Flashing Sword (1964)
 Shinobi No Mono 6: Iga Mansion (1965) as Makino Hyōgo
 The Sword of Doom (1966) as Dansho Tsukue
 Japan's Longest Day (1967) as Tadaatsu Ishiguro
 Kill! (1968) as Mizoguchi
 Shinsengumi (1969)
 Samurai Banners (1969) as Nagasaka Yorihiro
 Bakumatsu (1970) as Tōkichi
 Battle of Okinawa (1971) as Old man
 Daichūshingura (1971, TV) as Hara Sōemon
 The Fall of Ako Castle (1978) as Uchikawa Magozaemon
 Nichiren (1979) as Hōjō Masamura
 Sanada Yukimura no Bōryaku (1979) as Tenkai
 Akō Rōshi (1979, TV) as Horibe Yahei
 The Fierce Battles of Edo (1979, TV) (ep.25) as Kuroda Gensai
 Tokugawa Ichizoku no Hokai (1980) as Takachika Mōri
 Onihei Hankachō (1980–82, TV) as Funagata no Sōhei
 The Funeral (1984) as President of the old people's association
 Dixieland Daimyō (1986)

References

External links

1896 births
1987 deaths
Japanese male film actors
People from Saga Prefecture
20th-century Japanese male actors